Kalasatama (literally translated "fish port") is a neighbourhood in the city of Helsinki, Finland. The area is officially part of the Sörnäinen district; and like Sörnäinen, Kalasatama is located a little more than one kilometre north from the coastal centre of Helsinki, near the district of Hakaniemi, and the east side of Kalasatama borders the sea. Itäväylä, which leads in the direction of East Helsinki, runs next to Kalasatama. The Isoisänsilta pedestrian and cycling bridge, opened in 2016, connects Kalasatama to the nearby islands of Mustikkamaa, Korkeasaari and Kulosaari.

Kalasatama is projected to become a rather densely built-up area - about 25,000 inhabitants expected to come there, about as many as in Kallio. In addition, jobs are planned for Kalasatama for about 10,000 people. A concentration of 23- to 35-storey skyscraper towers are coming to the Kalasatama center area around the Kalasatama metro station, which was completed in 2007. Two of the towers, called Majakka and Loisto, and the Redi shopping centre are already completed, while the third tower Lumo One is still under construction. Construction of the fourth tower, T7, began in the end of 2021.

Attempts have been made to build a smart city from Kalasatama that focuses on smart sensors and robotics. Guide robots in the doctors' offices, robot buses and food delivery robots have already been on display in Kalasatama.

Formerly there was a cargo harbour in Kalasatama (Sörnäinen harbour) but it was moved to Vuosaari in late 2008. After that the construction of the neighbourhood began.

See also 
 Hermanni (Helsinki)

References

External links 

 Kalasatama | Uutta Helsinkiä - Kalasatama in the Uutta Helsinkiä site
 Kalasatama Smart City | My Helsinki - Kalasatama in the My Helsinki site

Neighbourhoods of Helsinki
Smart cities in Europe
Sörnäinen